

The Latécoère 15 was a French airliner built in 1925 for use on Latécoère's own airline on routes between France and Morocco. It was a  parasol-wing monoplane of conventional design, with twin engines mounted among the wing bracing struts, and small stub wings fitted to the lower fuselage as a mounting point for these struts and for the main undercarriage units. Six passengers could be carried in an enclosed cabin, and the pilot sat in an open cockpit in the nose.

The design was soon found to be seriously underpowered, unable to take off with the maximum load intended by the design, and unable to stay aloft on only one engine. Therefore, while Pierre-Georges Latécoère had intended for the aircraft to be used to extend the line's existing route to Casablanca over the desert to Dakar, the pilot assigned to fly it, Didier Daurat, flatly refused to do so. In the end, Daurat's view prevailed, and the ten Latécoère 15s were used on the Oran-Casablanca route and short feeder routes into Casablanca before being withdrawn from service between 1926 and 1929.

One of the aircraft was fitted with pontoons and trialled on a route between Alicante and Oran as the Latécoère 15H, but this was not deemed successful, and the aircraft was converted back.

The third prototype was built as a bomber, with a modified fuselage but otherwise unchanged. It was known as the Latécoère 19.  It had a fixed Vickers machine gun in the nose, an open dorsal turret with a Lewis machine gun and another Lewis gun mounted to fire down through a ventral port. There were bomb racks in the place of the passenger cabin, as well as ventral hooks for other ordnance.

Specifications

References

 
 
 aviafrance.com
 Уголок неба

1920s French airliners
1
Twin piston-engined tractor aircraft
High-wing aircraft